Ace is the debut extended play by South Korean singer Taemin. It was released by SM Entertainment on August 18, 2014. "Danger" was released as the lead single.

Background and release
On August 11, 2014, SM Entertainment announced Taemin would release an EP titled Ace on August 18. On August 13, a highlight medley video from the EP was uploaded to YouTube. The official music video for the lead single, titled "Danger", came out on August 15 and was directed by Kim Sung-wook, who said that through the video he aimed to explore "the themes of masculinity".

Composition 
The song "Danger" was composed by Thomas Troelsen, who also wrote the theme song for the World Cup in Brazil. On radio show Blue Night Radio, a listener asked Taemin, "I liked the shooting sound in your music program performances. Why isn't it included in the digital version [of the song]?" Taemin said, "It was added right before performing on a music program as effect sounds for performance. It's not included because it may damage the musical completion of the song." Another listener asked, "'Danger' has a Michael Jackson feel. Did you have it in mind while working on the song?". To this, Taemin replied, "The song was composed abroad and bought. It wasn't like our goal or role model but just happened so in the process. The company thought it would suit me well, and it's not a style I dislike."

The song's choreography was created by Ian Eastwood. Shinee member Jonghyun also added that he heard from the managers that after seeing Taemin dance, "I heard he found it amazing for you to copy him so well."  Eastwood says of the song is "...like Michael Jackson" and pays homage to Jackson's unique dance moves and that Taemin seems to understand what Jackson's performance means.

Reception
Ace reached number one on the weekly and monthly Gaon Album Chart, and number two on Billboards World Albums Chart.  "Danger" reached number five on the weekly Gaon Digital Chart.  At South Korea's annual music awards, Ace won the Album Bonsang at the 29th Golden Disc Awards, and received further nominations at the Gaon Chart K-Pop Awards and Seoul Music Awards.

Korean music publication Weiv described the track "Danger" as "[...] a song that showcases the bright sense of Thomas Troelsen good at using multiple tracks, stands out. Most of all, it is a rare song among recent SM songs which doesn't tire you after many replays." In a review for the publication, Park Jun-woo said that the EP showed that Taemin had become an adult, contrasting with his image as the youngest Shinee member. He observed that it was unusual for a member of an SM group to release a solo album. IZE said "the young mysterious thief character with light moves but serious business came to life with Taemin's performance." IZM reviewer Jeong Yu-na noted the influence of Michael Jackson and felt that the EP displayed Taemin's growth as a vocalist. She particularly highlighted "Danger", which she thought created a synergistic effect when combined with the choreography, and "Pretty Boy", which she described as a "hidden weapon". She explained that collaborating with Kai allowed them both to overcome their weaknesses.

Track listing

Charts

Weekly charts

Monthly charts

Year-end charts

Sales and certifications

Awards and nominations

Release history

References

Taemin EPs
SM Entertainment EPs
Genie Music EPs
2014 debut EPs
Dance music EPs
Korean-language EPs